Basilio Kaczurak (February 7, 1919 – February 7, 1987) was a Ukrainian composer, bandurist, orchestra conductor, and promoter of Ukrainian folk music in South America. On June 6 1961 he founded the Taras Shevchenko bandurist capella in Argentina, directing it with great success for 25 years.

Biography

Basilio Kaczurak was the initiator and promoter of Ukrainian folk culture along South America devoting his life to teaching and sharing the art of his homeland to the new generations.
The bandurist capellas are vocal-instrumental groups besides the development and promotion of the former Ukrainian stringed musical instrument bandura, and are intended to backup ancient works of Ukrainian musical repertoire.

With a great devotion in years where technology was scarce, he fought to make known the existence of its insistence to promote Ukrainian music culture along South America to different artists of the same culture throughout the world including Victor Mishalow.

In 2011 was recognized by the Ukraine Government and the Buenos Aires Government on the anniversary of its capella creation in a special presentation at ND Ateneo theater of Buenos Aires attended by international artists.

Interesting Facts 
 In 1971 developed a technique to teach the tones by colors in the bandura and other instruments such as the hammered psaltery.

Awards 
 Order of Merit City of Buenos Aires Government & Ukraine Embassy (Argentina), (2011)

References
 1. Historic World Ukrainian Composers and musicians.

External links
 Argentine Ukrainian Embassy - Ukrainian Educational Centers in Argentine - Bandurists Capella Tarás Shevchenko.
  Brasil Ukrainian Society Newsletter (p.16).
 Argentinian Concepción de la sierra Newsletter (p.1)

1919 births
1987 deaths
Bandurists
Kobzarstvo
Composers for bandura
Soviet emigrants to Argentina
Naturalized citizens of Argentina
Recipients of the title of Merited Artist of Ukraine
Chevaliers of the Order of Merit (Ukraine)
Soviet composers